Ivan Aleksandrovich Shtyl (born 6 August 1986) is a Russian sprint canoeist who has competed since 2004. He won eighteen medals at the ICF Canoe Sprint World Championships with twelve golds (C-1 200 m: 2010, C-1 4 × 200 m: 2009, 2010, 2011, 2013, 2014; C-2 200 m: 2006, 2007, 2014, 2015; C-2 500 m: 2013, 2014) and six silvers (C-1 200 m: 2011, 2013; C-2 200 m: 2009, 2010; C-2 500 m: 2009, C-4 200 m: 2007).  He has also won an Olympic bronze medal, at the 2012 Summer Olympics in the men's C-1 200 m, but after the original silver medalist Jevgenij Shuklin of Lithuania got disqualified due to dopping, Ivan was finally promoted to silver in 2021.

References

External links
 
 Canoe09.ca profile 

1986 births
Living people
People from Komsomolsk-on-Amur
Russian male canoeists
Canoeists at the 2012 Summer Olympics
Olympic canoeists of Russia
Olympic medalists in canoeing
Olympic silver medalists for Russia
ICF Canoe Sprint World Championships medalists in Canadian
Medalists at the 2012 Summer Olympics
European Games competitors for Russia
Canoeists at the 2019 European Games
Universiade medalists in canoeing
Universiade gold medalists for Russia
Medalists at the 2013 Summer Universiade
Sportspeople from Khabarovsk Krai